Farrukh Karimovich Zokirov (born 16 April 1946) is an Uzbek and Soviet singer, composer and actor. He has been artistic director of  folk rock band Yalla since 1976. Zokirov has been voted People's Artist in six states of the republic, and he is a laureate of the State Prize of Uzbekistan. From May 2002 to July 2004, he was deputy minister of the Ministry of Culture and Sports of the Republic of Uzbekistan.

Biography
Zokirov was born in Tashkent in 1946 into a family of professional musicians. His father, Karim Zokirov, was an opera singer, a baritone and People's Artist of Uzbek SSR in 1939, and the soloist of the Uzbek State Opera and Ballet Theatre named after Alisher Navoi. His Mother, Shohista Saidova, was also a singer, a folk singer, a soloist for the Tashkent musical theatre of drama and Mukimi comedy. His parents met while studying at the Moscow Conservatory. The family had five sons and a daughter: Batir, Louise, Naufal, Farrukh, Jamshid, Ravshan. The children grew up in a house that was often visited by leading Uzbek artists and singers of the time. The art atmosphere and creativity nourished the children from an early age. This way, the Zokirov musical and artistic dynasty was formed in Tashkent.

Family 
Father – Karim Zokirov (1912–1977), opera singer (baritone), People's Artist of the Uzbek SSR
Mother – Shohista Saidova
Spouse(s) – Anna Zokirova, Nargiz Boyhonova
Brother – Botir Zokirov, (1936–1985), Uzbek Soviet singer, writer, poet, artist and actor, founder of pop art in the country, People's Artist of the Uzbek SSR
Brother – Jamshid Zokirov (1949–2012), Soviet and Uzbek film and theatre actor, TV presenter, honoured artist of Uzbekistan
Sister – Louise Zokirova, singer
Niece – Nargiz Zakirova, daughter of Louise Zakirova, singer

Filmography

Honorary titles and awards
People's Artist of the Uzbek SSR
People's Artist of Karakalpakstan
People's Artist of Kazakhstan
People's Artist of Kyrgyzstan
People's Artist of Tajikistan
People's Artist of Ingushetia
During the 1991 summer, documents were filed for registration of the title of People's Artist of the Soviet Union, however, due to the Soviet coup d'état attempt during August 1991, this process was not concluded.

References

  Фарух Закиров ("Ялла"): "Нам просто хотелось показать миру, что есть такая уникальная культура – Узбекистан" (интервью)

External links  
 Фарух Закиров: «Ялла» — это состояние души» (интервью)
 Волшебная лампа ЯЛЛАдина (интервью) 
 Интервью газете «Труд», № 179 от 05.10.2002

Soviet male film actors
Uzbekistani male film actors
20th-century Uzbekistani male actors
20th-century Uzbekistani male singers
Soviet male singers
Soviet vocal-instrumental ensembles
Uzbekistani television presenters
1946 births
Musicians from Tashkent
Living people
21st-century Uzbekistani male singers
21st-century Uzbekistani male actors
People's Artists of Uzbekistan